A beauty filter is a filter applied to still photographs, or to video in real time, to enhance the physical attractiveness of the subject. Typical effects of such filters include smoothing skin texture and modifying the proportions of facial features, for example enlarging the eyes or narrowing the nose.

Filters may be included as a built-in feature of social media apps such as Instagram or Snapchat, or implemented through standalone applications such as Facetune.

Critics have raised concerns that the widespread use of such filters on social media may lead to negative body image, particularly among girls.

Background
The manipulation of photos to enhance attractiveness has long been possible using software such as Adobe Photoshop and, before that, analogue techniques such as airbrushing. However, such tools required considerable technical and artistic skill, and so their use was mostly limited to professional contexts, such as magazines or advertisements.

By contrast, filters work in an automated fashion through the use of complex algorithms, requiring little or no input from the user. This ease of use, in combination with the increase in processing power of smartphones, and the rise of social media and selfie culture, have led to photographic manipulation occurring on a much wider scale than ever before.

One of the earliest examples of a content-aware digital photographic filter is red-eye reduction.

Effects
Typical changes applied by beauty filters include:
 Smoothing skin texture; minimizing fine lines and blemishes
 Erasing under-eye bags
 Erasing naso-labial lines ("laugh lines")
 Application of virtual makeup, such as lipstick or eyeshadow
 Slimming the face; erasing double chins
 Enlarging the eyes
 Whitening teeth
 Narrowing the nose
 Increasing fullness of the lips

Beauty filters most frequently target the face, though in some cases they may affect other body parts. For example, the app "Retouch Me" was reported to have a feature which allows users to superimpose visible abdominal muscles (a "six pack") onto photos featuring the subject's bare stomach.

Psychological effects
Some commentators have expressed concern that beauty filters may create unrealistic beauty standards, particularly among girls, and contribute to rates of body dysmorphic disorder. A correlation has been established between negative body image and the use of beautifying filters, though the direction of causation is unknown.

The inability to discern whether a particular image has been filtered is thought to exacerbate their negative psychological effects. Policymakers have advocated for social networks to disclose the use of filters; TikTok, Instagram, and Snapchat all label filtered photos and videos with the name of the filter applied.

Cosmetic procedures
Filters have been implicated in greater demand for cosmetic surgery and injections. The term "Snapchat dysmorphia" was coined by cosmetic doctor Tijion Esho to describe patients who presented to plastic surgeons seeking procedures to mimic the effects of filters, such as a narrowed nose, enlarged eyes, fuller lips, and smoothed skin.

Instagram previously hosted a number of third-party filters which explicitly simulated the effects of cosmetic procedures, as well as a filter, "FixMe", which allowed users to annotate their face with areas for surgical improvement, as a plastic surgeon might do with a marker. After public controversy around these filters, Facebook banned them in October 2019, along with all "distortion" filters, which altered the proportions of the face. In August 2020, Facebook re-allowed distortion filters, but continued to ban filters which "directly promote cosmetic surgery". Facial distortion filters are also unlisted in the app's "Effects Gallery", which shows the most popular filters at the time.

Apps
Beauty filters are available as a built-in feature of many social media apps, most notably Instagram, Snapchat, and TikTok. In the case of Instagram and Snapchat, most filters are created by third-party developers rather than the app developers themselves. The video-conferencing app Zoom includes a "Touch-up My Appearance" filter which smooths blemishes and under-eye bags.

Beautifying effects may be bundled as part of other, more whimsical augmented reality filters, such as Instagram and Snapchat filters which give the user puppy ears or a flower crown.

Beauty filters may also be applied using standalone "beauty apps". One of the most popular such apps is Facetune. In 2017, Facetune was the most popular paid app on the Apple App Store. As of 2019, the paid app, and the free counterpart, Facetune2, had more than 55 million users between them. FaceApp is another image editing app which uses deep learning algorithms. Extreme use of the app's beauty filters was the subject of the "Yassification" Internet meme, in which photos are filtered to hyper-glamorour extremes to humorous effect.

Filters are most commonly applied to self-taken portraits ("selfies"). The close distance from which such photos are taken may create undesirable distortions, such as increasing the perceived size of the nose.

References

Photographic techniques
Social media
Digital media use and mental health